Stephen Anthony Mallon (born 7 February 1999) is an Irish professional footballer who plays as a left winger for NIFL Premiership side Cliftonville.

Playing career

Club
Mallon joined A-League side Central Coast Mariners on loan from Sheffield United in January 2019.

On 10 January 2020, Mallon signed for League of Ireland Premier Division side Derry City on loan. He made his league debut against Finn Harps on 21 February before scoring his first league goal the following week against Bohemians at the Ryan McBride Brandywell Stadium. One week after his first goal for the club on Friday 6 March he scored again against Waterford away at the RSC. In July, his loan was extended until the end of the League of Ireland Premier Division season. Mallon returned to Sheffield United after making 17 appearances and scoring 3 goals in all competitions for Derry City.
On 12 January 2021, Mallon departed Sheffield United, joining League of Ireland Premier Division side Bohemians on a permanent basis.

International
Mallon represented Northern Ireland at youth level before switching allegiances to play for the Republic of Ireland's youth teams.
In September 2020, he announced his intention to switch allegiances back to Northern Ireland.

Career statistics
Professional appearances – correct as of 2 July 2022.

References

External links

1999 births
Living people
Association footballers from Belfast
Association footballers from Northern Ireland
Republic of Ireland association footballers
Northern Ireland youth international footballers
Republic of Ireland youth international footballers
Association football midfielders
Sheffield United F.C. players
Central Coast Mariners FC players
Derry City F.C. players
Bohemian F.C. players
Cliftonville F.C. players
A-League Men players
League of Ireland players
NIFL Premiership players
Expatriate soccer players in Australia